The Grand'Goule or Big Maw is a folklore dragon that continues to be celebrated in the Poitou region in France.

In 2016 a nightclub named after the dragon stood accused in the death of an inebriated patron bouncers had ejected who subsequently stumbled off a nearby cliff.

A choir named after the dragon has a long history.

References 

Folklore